Sir Henry Wilson Smith, KCB, KBE (30 December 1904 – 28 March 1978) was a British civil servant.

Educated at Royal Grammar School, Newcastle and Peterhouse, Cambridge, he began his career in the General Post Office in 1927 before moving to HM Treasury in 1930. He was Assistant Private Secretary to the Chancellor of the Exchequer from 1932 and Principal Private Secretary in 1940. He was Under-Secretary to the Treasury 1942–1946, Permanent Secretary at the Ministry of Defence 1947-1948 and additional Second Secretary to the Treasury 1948 to 1951. He was made KBE in 1945 and KCB in 1949.

In retirement he held several directorships including of the Bank of England.

References
 WILSON SMITH, Sir Henry, Who Was Who, A & C Black, 1920–2008; online edn, Oxford University Press, Dec 2007, accessed 27 Dec 2011

1904 births
1978 deaths
British civil servants